Rhipidiomyces is a genus of fungi in the family Laboulbeniaceae. This is a monotypic genus, containing the single species Rhipidiomyces acriti.

References

External links
Rhipidiomyces at Index Fungorum

Laboulbeniomycetes
Monotypic Laboulbeniomycetes genera